AD 71 (LXXI) was a common year starting on Tuesday (link will display the full calendar) of the Julian calendar. At the time, it was known as the Year of the Consulship of Vespasian and Nerva (or, less frequently, year 824 Ab urbe condita). The denomination AD 71 for this year has been used since the early medieval period, when the Anno Domini calendar era became the prevalent method in Europe for naming years.

Events

By place

Roman Empire 
 The Romans establish a fortress at York (Eboracum), as a base for their northern forces. Initially established solely for Legio IX Hispana, it expands later to include public housing, baths and temples.
 Battle of Stanwick: Quintus Petillius Cerialis, governor of Britain, puts down a revolt by the Brigantes.
 Emperors Vespasian and Marcus Cocceius Nerva are Roman Consuls.
 Battle of Treves: Cerialis defeats Claudius Civilis, thus quelling the Batavian rebellion.
 Titus is awarded with a triumph, accompanied by Vespasian and his brother Titus Flavius Domitian. In the parade are Jewish prisoners and treasures of the Temple of Jerusalem, including the Menorah and the Pentateuch. The leader of the Zealots, Simon Bar Giora, is lashed and strangled in the Forum.
 Titus is made praetorian prefect of the Praetorian Guard and receives pro-consular command and also tribunician power, all of which indicates that Vespasian will follow the hereditary tradition of succession.
 Herodium, a Jewish fortress south of Jerusalem, is conquered and destroyed by Legio X Fretensis on their way to Masada.
 Doncaster is founded by Roman settlers. The area was originally known as Danum.

Asia 
 Reign of Rabel II, king of Nabataea. He makes Bostra, Syria, his second capital.

By topic

Religion 
 Mithraism begins to spread throughout the Roman Empire.

Births 
 Chadae, Korean king of Goguryeo (d. 165)

Deaths 
 Liu Ying, Chinese prince of the Han Dynasty who converted to Buddhism

References 

0071

als:70er#Johr 71